The 1990 Women's World Snooker Championship was a women's snooker tournament. Sixty-six players entered the event, with the matches leading up to the semi-final being played at the Matchroom Club in Romford, England from 25 October and 4 November. The semi-finals and final were played at the Waldorf Hotel in London from 9–11 November, and received nine hours of television coverage on the European satellite channel Screensport. The competition was promoted by Barry Hearn's Matchroom organisation and sponsored by Trusthouse Forte and had a total prize fund of £30,000. Karen Corr, who had her 21st birthday on the day of her semi-final match, won in the final 7–4 against Stacey Hillyard. Following this tournament, losing finalist Hillyard replaced Allison Fisher as the top-ranked women's snooker player.

Main draw 

Sources:

References

World Women's Snooker Championship
1990 in snooker
1990 in English sport